Major Raja Aziz Bhatti (6 August 1928– 12 September 1965) born as Aziz Ahmad but usually known as Raja Aziz Bhatti, was a Pakistan Army officer.  He was awarded the Nishan-e-Haider  for his actions of valour during the Battle of Burki in the Indo-Pak War of 1965. He is revered as a hero of the 1965 war in Pakistan, till this day. 

Prior to gaining officer's commission in the Pakistan Army, Major Bhatti served in the Pakistan Air Force as an enlisted man and left the air force as a Corporal in a favor of transferring to the Army. In his brief military career, he was a staff officer working on administrative positions and widely popular as the "Muhafiz-e-Lahore" (Protector of Lahore).

In 1997, he was the subject of a critically acclaimed biographical war drama telefilm, Major Raja Aziz Bhatti, produced by the ISPR and directed by Salim Tahir of the PTV.

Biography

Early life and military career

Raja Aziz Ahmed Bhatti was born in British Hong Kong on 6 August 1928 into a Punjabi Rajput family. His family hailed from a small village about 110 miles away from the Gujrat District of the Punjab in India, who had immigrated to British Hong Kong after his father and two uncles found employment in the Hong Kong Police Force. His father, Mohammad Abdullah Bhatti, was an alumnus of the Queen's College in Hong Kong who later served as an Inspector in the Hong Kong Police Force. Aziz Bhatti was educated in Hong Kong where he completed his matriculation and attended the Queen's College but his education was halted due to the Japanese invasion and occupation of Hong Kong in 1941.  He was drafted into the Imperial Japanese Navy in 1944, first serving at the rank of the seaman recruit and as the tower watchman (observation post) before being directed to attend the officer school offered by the Imperial Japanese Navy due to his educational qualifications.

However in December 1945, the Bhatti family relocated to India, and Aziz Bhatti enlisted to join the Royal Indian Air Force as an airman in June 1946. After the establishment of Pakistan in 1947, Bhatti joined the Pakistan Air Force and promoted as Corporal (Cpl.), which he continued to serve in the air force until 1948. Cpl. Bhatti was a prospective candidate to join the Air Force Academy in Risalpur and was known to be among the brightest members of the Air Force in its early years.

On 21 January 1948, Bhatti submitted an application to the Ministry of Defense (MoD), asking to be transferred to the Pakistan Army, which was approved and Bhatti was directed to attend the Pakistan Military Academy in Kakul in 1948. There, he distinguish himself in studies and athletics among his classmates, and passed out from the academy at the top of his class in the class of the first PMA Long Course, in 1950.  He was awarded the Sword of Honor and the Norman gold medallion by the ceremony's chief guest, Prime Minister Liaquat Ali Khan. He was commissioned as the 2nd-Lt. in the 4th battalion of the 16th Punjab Regiment (4/16th Punjab Regiment). He was promoted to Lieutenant in 1951 and to captain in 1953.

In 1956, Aziz was sent to Canada to attend the staff course at the Canadian Army Command and Staff College where he remained until graduation from strategic studies courses in 1960. Upon returning to Pakistan, Capt. Aziz was posted with the 17th Punjab Regiment as a General Staff Officer (GSO) until 1962. After being promoted as Major in the Army in 1962, Maj. Aziz was taken in the faculty of the School of Infantry and Tactics in Quetta, which he remained until 1964.

Indo-Pakistani war of 1965

From January 1965 till May 1965, Maj. Bhatti served as the General Staff Officer (GSO) of the 17th Punjab Regiment, but was later posted as the commander of the two military companies after the Indian Army's launching the invasion by crossing the international borders in September 1965. Leading the military companies, Maj. Bhatti was initially deployed on the forward positions of the BRB Canal near the Burki area that falls in the vicinity of the Lahore District in Pakistan-side Punjab.

Official engagement with the Indian Army took place between 7–10 September when the Indian Army begin its push of capturing the Burki sector through artillery and armory in a view of entering in Lahore. Despite Indian Army's efforts of relatively easily capturing of the Burki sector through the BRB Canal, the outnumbered military companies under Major Bhatti had forced the Indian Army to engage in hand-to-hand combat during the night of the 7/8 September 1965, and the fighting continued till the next three days despite Indian Army having numerical advantage. Although the defense of the Burki sector through the BRB Canal had less importance in the views of military strategists working at the Army GHQ in Rawalpindi, its defense was fierce and tenacious, and the Indian Army had to halt its plans of capturing Lahore and focused on capturing the Burki sector and destroying the bridge connecting the BRB Canal. It is unclear why the Pakistan Army did not send the reinforcement teams to provide back up to Maj. Bhatti's teams and the questionnaire-based controversy was later generated on why Maj. Bhatti and his teams were left alone to fight bravely for a long time.

Bhatti declined an offer to take leave with his family in Lahore and instead told a sergeant, "Do not recall me. I don't want to go back. I will shed the last drop of my blood in the defense of my dear homeland." Maj. Bhatti moved towards building up the trenches and positioned himself towards forward observation to view enemy movements, where he would often stand for a better view to direct howitzer fire.

Bhatti was killed on 10 September 1965.  He stood up to observe enemy positions and direct artillery fire, despite warnings to take cover, and was killed by shellfire. Maj. Bhatti was 37 years old at the time of his death.

Memorials

Ancestral Home 
Maj. Aziz Bhatti was buried in the courtyard of his ancestral home at Ladian, a small village near Gujrat, Punjab in Pakistan. In 1966, the federal government accepted the recommendations and announced to posthumously award

the Nishan-e-Haider for his gallantry and actions of valor during the defense of the Burki.

Later the federal government funded to build the marble tombstone at his ancestral home in 1967 at his locality.

The Presidential Nishan-e-Haider citation on his grave is written in Urdu and is actually a poem; and it reads with translation as:

Citation 
Rouge on the face of shahadat, pride of the country and the nation are these fearless warriors, a strike of their sword wipes out the mightiest of foes
this one who came out victorious in the struggle for the cause of ALLAH is lying here in the delight of the afterlife dream. Major Bhatti fought valiantly on Lahore Front, and is posthumously presented with the Nishan-e-Haider.

Memorial at Barki 
A memorial to Major Aziz Bhatti was built in 2019 at the site where he was killed defending against an Indian attack on 6 September 1965. The memorial is located approximately 500 metres north of the Barki Road/BRB Canal checkpoint on the west side of BRB Canal. The citation reads as follows in English (with editorial additions): Major Raja Aziz Bhatti known as "Muhafiz-e-Lahore (Defender of Lahore)" received Pakistans highest award for his valor. He was born in Hong Kong in [a] Muslim Rajput family (belongs to Lahore) in 1928. He got commissioned in [the] Pakistan Army in 1950 (17 Punjab Regiment). Major Aziz Bhatti was posted to Barki sector Lahore, during [the] Indo Pakwar 1965. Being [a] Company Commander, he moved his Platoon forward to this bank of BRBLC [BRB Canal] under constant fire of enemy tanks and artillery. He resisted for five days and nights in defending [this] Pakistani outpost on [the] strategic BRBLC without rest. On 6 September 1965, he left his company Headquarter[s] and move[d] to his forward Platoon and stayed with them under incessant artillery & tank attacks. He positioned himself in this elevated place to watch every move of [the] enemy. This point was vulnerable to enemy tank & artillery fire. After five days of continuous fighting on [the] front he was offered to be relieved for rest but he refused of [sic] being relieved and said "I do not want to go back, I will shed the last drop of my blood in the defense of my dear homeland." On 10 September 1965, Major Aziz Bhatti was hit by enemy tank shell in the chest while observing [the] enemy move from this elevated place. He was awarded with highest Gallantry [the] award of Nishan-e-Haider on [as a result of his] supreme act of bravery.

Galleries

Popular culture and extended family

In 1968, a paintings exhibition was inaugurated in Lahore, Punjab in Pakistan depicting Pakistan's war heroes including the first sketched portrait of Maj. Aziz Bhatti. In 1997, he was the subject of a popular and critically acclaimed biographical war drama telefilm, Major Raja Aziz Bhatti, produced by the ISPR and directed by Salim Tahir of the PTV.

It was reported in media that former Pakistan Army's General, Raheel Sharif who was the former Chief of Army Staff and Major Shabbir Sharif, another recipient of Nishan-e-Haider of Pakistan Army, are the nephews of Major Raja Aziz Bhatti.

His grandson Babar Bhatti, a Canada-based businessman, is married to the famous supermodel-turned-actress Iman Ali.

Awards and decorations

See also 
 Lahore Front

References 

1928 births
1965 deaths
Punjabi people
People from British Hong Kong
Imperial Japanese Navy personnel of World War II
Pakistani expatriates in Hong Kong
People from Kharian
Pakistani Muslims
Pakistan Air Force personnel
Pakistan Military Academy alumni
Pakistan Army officers
Pakistani expatriates in Canada
Military personnel of the Indo-Pakistani War of 1965
Pakistani military personnel killed in action
Recipients of Nishan-e-Haider
Alumni of Queen's College, Hong Kong